Utricularia micropetala is a small annual carnivorous plant that belongs to the genus Utricularia. It is endemic to western tropical Africa and is found in the Central African Republic, Guinea, Nigeria, and Sierra Leone. It was originally described by James Edward Smith in 1819. It can be distinguished from all other species in section Oligocista by the large and inflated spur and very short lower corolla lip.

See also 
 List of Utricularia species

References 

Carnivorous plants of Africa
Flora of Guinea
Flora of Nigeria
Flora of Sierra Leone
Flora of the Central African Republic
micropetala